Rajashekar Shanbal (born 1 September 1978) is an Indian cricketer. He played four first-class and three List A matches between 2001 and 2005. He was also part of India's squad for the 1998 Under-19 Cricket World Cup.

References

External links
 

1978 births
Living people
Indian cricketers
Karnataka cricketers
People from Hubli